This is a complete list of Azerbaijani boxers.

A 
 Jeyhun Abiyev
 Magomed Abdulhamidov
 Vugar Alakbarov 
 Elchin Alizade
 Romal Amanov 
 Magomed Aripgadjiev
 Fuad Aslanov

G 
 Gaybatulla Gadzhialiyev

H 
 Vatan Huseynli 
 Rovshan Huseynov

I 
 Shahin Imranov
 Ali Ismailov

K 
 Ruslan Khairov

M 
 Magomedrasul Majidov 
 Elvin Mamishzada
 Aghasi Mammadov 
 Samir Mammadov
 Teymur Mammadov 
 Soltan Migitinov

T 
 Javid Taghiyev

V 
 Elena Vystropova

 
Boxers
Azerbaijani boxers